In the 1937 season of the Campeonato Carioca, the last under the split between FBF and CBD, two championships were disputed, each by a different league.

FMD Championship

The edition of the Campeonato Carioca organized by FMD (Federação Metropolitana de Desportos, or Metropolitan Sports Federation) kicked off on May 2, 1937 and ended on July 11, 1937. Eight teams participated. no teams were relegated.

System
The tournament would be disputed in three stages, on the same format as in the previous year:
First round: All eight teams play in a single round-robin format against each other. The team with the most points qualifies to the Finals.
Second round: All eight teams play in a single round-robin format against each other. The team with the most points qualifies to the Finals.
Finals: The round winners play in a best-of-three points series for the title.

However, in 17 of July, with only two matches left to be played in the first round, the chairmen of América, Pedro Magalhães Correa, and Vasco da Gama, Pedro Novaes, put forward a proposal for not only the reconciliation of FMD and LCF, but FBF and CBD, which was accepted by both leagues' clubs two days later. As a consequence, FMD effectively ceased to exist, with its championship yet unfinished. At the time, São Cristóvão led the first round and no other teams could reach it, even with the matches that still hadn't been held. In 3 of September, the FMD General Council declared São Cristóvão as the champion of its 1937 championship, but that title is not recognized as an official Carioca title.

Championship

LFRJ Championship

Ever since 1935, the FMD championship had been starting earlier than the LCF championship. as such, by the time both leagues were reconciled, LCF's 1937 championship hadn't even started.

The new state league would be called LFRJ (Liga de Futebol do Rio de Janeiro, or Rio de Janeiro Football League), and would have nine teams as founding members - Vasco da Gama, Botafogo, Bangu, São Cristóvão and Madureira, from FMD, and América, Flamengo, Fluminense and Bonsucesso from LCF. The 1937 championship was slated to have twelve teams, and as such, Olaria, Andarahy (both from FMD) and Portuguesa (LCF) were invited to join the championship.

To celebrate the reconciliation, América and Vasco da Gama would play a friendly match, with a trophy called the Taça da Paz (Peace Cup) at stake. Vasco won that match by 3-2, and the derby between both teams has been known as "Clássico da Paz" (Peace Derby) ever since.

The LFRJ championship would kick off on October 1, 1937 and would end only on January 30, 1938. Fluminense won the title for the 11th time. no teams were relegated, although Olaria, Andarahy and Portuguesa weren't invited back for 1938's championship.

System
The tournament would be disputed in a double round-robin format, with the team with the most points winning the title.

Championship

References

Campeonato Carioca seasons
Carioca